Epping is a market town and civil parish in the Epping Forest district of the County of Essex, England.

Epping is the terminus for London Underground's Central line. The town has a number of historic Grade I and II and Grade III listed buildings. The weekly market, which dates to 1253, is held each Monday. In 2001 the parish had a population of 11,047 which increased to 11,461 at the 2011 Census.

Epping became twinned with the German town of Eppingen in north-west Baden-Württemberg in 1981.

History

"Epinga", a small community of a few scattered farms and a chapel on the edge of the forest, is mentioned in the Domesday Book of 1086. However, the settlement referred to is known today as Epping Upland. It is not known for certain when the present-day Epping was first settled. By the mid-12th century a settlement known as Epping Heath (later named Epping Street), had developed south of Epping Upland as a result of the clearing of forest for cultivation. In 1253 King Henry III conveyed the right to hold a weekly market in Epping Street which helped to establish the town as a centre of trade and has continued to the present day (the sale of cattle in the High Street continued until 1961).

The linear village of Epping Heath developed into a small main-road town and by the early 19th century development had taken place along what is now High Street and Hemnall Street. Hemnall Street was until 1894 in the parish of Theydon Garnon, as was the railway station. Up to 25 stagecoaches and mailcoaches a day passed through the town from London en route to Norwich, Cambridge and Bury St. Edmunds. In the early 19th century, 26 coaching inns lined the High Street. Two survive today as public houses: The George and Dragon and The Black Lion. The advent of the railways ended coach traffic and the town declined, but it revived after the extension of a railway branch line from Loughton in 1865 and the advent of the motor car.

A number of listed buildings, most dating from the 18th century, line both sides of the High Street although many were substantially altered internally during the 19th century. Some of the oldest buildings in the town are at each end of the Conservation Area, such as Beulah Lodge in Lindsey Street (17th century), and a group of 17th- and early 18th-century cottages numbered 98–110 on High Street.

The original parish church, first mentioned in 1177, was All Saints' in Epping Upland, the nave and chancel of which date from the 13th Century. In 1833, the 14th-century chapel of St John the Baptist in the High Road was rebuilt in the Gothic Revival style. It became the parish church of Epping in 1888 and was again rebuilt. A large tower was added in 1909.

The town is known in some quarters for the Epping sausage, and, in the 18th and 19th centuries, for Epping butter.

Governance
Epping is part of the Epping Forest parliamentary constituency, represented by Conservative MP Eleanor Laing. From 1924 to 1945, the old Epping division of Essex (which included Woodford, Chingford, Harlow and Loughton as well as Epping) was represented by Winston Churchill. It now sits in the Epping and Theydon Bois division of Essex County Council which is Liberal Democrat held. The town is divided into two district council wards. Epping Hemnall encompasses most of the town south-east of Epping High Street (B1393) including Ivy Chimneys, Fiddlers Hamlet, Coopersale and Coopersale Street. The rest of Epping lies in Epping Lindsey and Thornwood ward, as does Thornwood in the adjacent parish of North Weald Bassett. Both wards elect three councillors each.

As well as the county and district councils, Epping has a town council consisting of 12 councillors, six each elected from Epping Hemnall and Epping Lindsey wards, one of which is elected Mayor of Epping and acts as Chairman of Council, as well as a civic and ceremonial head of the local community. Epping is a successor parish, created in 1974 when the Epping Urban District was abolished.

Epping Forest District Council's headquarters are located in the High Street, Epping.

Geography
Epping is north of the village of Theydon Bois.

The Town lies north-east of junction 26 (Waltham Abbey, Loughton A121) of the M25 motorway and south-west of junction 7 (Harlow) of the M11 motorway.

Community

Most of the population live in the built up area centred on and around the High Street (B1393) and Station Road. About a thousand people live in the village of Coopersale which, while physically separated from Epping by forest land, is still part of the civil parish. A few dozen households make up the hamlets of Coopersale Street and Fiddlers Hamlet. Much of the eastern part of the present parish was until 1895 in the parish of Theydon Garnon.

Epping market attracts shoppers from surrounding villages and towns every Monday. A prominent building in Epping is the District Council's office with its clock tower, designed to bring balance to the High Street with the old Gothic Revival water tower at the southern end, built in 1872, and St John's Church tower in the centre. The centre of Epping on and around the High Street is a designated conservation area.

Transport

Epping is served by several rail, bus and road routes, as well as walking trails.

Rail and tube 
Epping tube station is a London Underground terminus, on the Central line.

The station is in London fare zone 6, and accepts Oyster and contactless payment methods. There is a car park at the station. There is no Night Tube, as Central line services overnight on Fridays and Saturdays terminate at Loughton.

The Central line links Epping directly with East London, Stratford, The City, Oxford Street, and destinations in West London.

Until 1994, the Central line extended north from Epping to North Weald, Blake Hall (until 1981), and Ongar. Much of the line is now served by a heritage railway - the Epping Ongar Railway. The heritage railway does not serve Epping tube station, but the museum runs a heritage London Bus to the Central line station on some open days.

The nearest mainline stations to Epping are at Roydon, Harlow and Waltham Cross. Services from these stations are operated by Greater Anglia and link the area directly with London Liverpool Street, Stratford, Hertford, Cambridge and Stansted Airport.

Bus

Road 
Epping High Street is numbered the B1393. The route runs north-south through the town.

To the north, the B1393 carries traffic to the Hastingwood Interchange, where it meets the M11 motorway for Cambridge, Stansted Airport and London (Junction 7), as well as the A414 for Harlow and Chelmsford. Southbound traffic meets the Wake Arms roundabout for the A104 to Woodford and the North Circular Road, and the A121 for Loughton, Waltham Abbey and the M25 London Orbital.

The B181 runs east-west through Epping, between Roydon and North Weald.

The B182 runs along the south-western perimeter of the town, between Epping's Bell Common and Epping Upland.

These roads are maintained by Essex Highways.

The M11 bypasses the town to the east, and the M25 bypasses Epping to the south. M25 traffic passes underneath Bell Common through a tunnel.

Walking and cycling 
Much of Epping Forest has unlimited walking access. The City of London Corporation, which looks after Epping Forest, has produced several waymarked walking routes for leisure.

There are waymarked footpaths between the town and surrounding villages, such as Coopersale and Theydon Bois.

Epping and the surrounding forest is popular with cyclists. There are no cycle lanes on the B1393, but a cycle lane runs alongside the A104 between Walthamstow in London and the Wake Arms roundabout.

Education
 Epping St John's School, a Church of England school, is the only mainstream secondary school in Epping. It has an active charity fundraising group led by a Student Executive team. In 2020 two hundred students were awarded the Rotary Prize for 'Service to Schools was in Essex' by the local Epping Rotary Club.
 The Tower School, a special educational needs school at the top of Tower Road, just off of the B1393.
 Coopersale Hall School, a prep school at the end of Centre Drive Lane, Epping.
 Ivy Chimneys Primary School, a primary school located in Ivy Chimneys, Epping.
 Epping Primary School
 Coopersale and Theydon Garnon C.E. (Vol.Cont.) Primary School. A primary school located in Coopersale village.

Sport
Epping Town played in the Isthmian League until folding during the 1984–85 season. Epping FC currently play in the Essex Olympian Football League. Both have played at Stonards Hill. There are two cricket clubs at the south of the town: Epping Cricket Club at Lower Bury Lane, and Epping Foresters Cricket Club at Bell Common which is partly in the neighbouring parish of Epping Upland. Epping Foresters ground is on top of the M25 motorway (Bell Common Tunnel).

Notable people

 Jill Barklem, writer and illustrator
 Nick Berry, actor
 James Buckley, actor
 David Byron, former lead singer of rock band Uriah Heep
 Winston Churchill, Member of Parliament for the town and the larger constituency named after it from 1924 to 1945, including his tenure as Prime Minister during World War II
 Dodie Clark, singer and youtuber
 Crass, band
 Sidney Godley, first private soldier awarded the Victoria Cross during the Great War
 Dave Gahan, singer, Depeche Mode frontman
 Philip Hammond, former Chancellor of the Exchequer
 David Halls, television entertainer and chef 
 Glenn Hoddle, former professional football player and manager
 Griff Rhys Jones, TV presenter and comedian
 Jason Merrells, actor
 Julian Mitchell, screenwriter and novelist
 Dennis Rofe, former professional footballer
 Ben Shephard, television presenter
 Sheridan Smith, actress
 Lisa Snowdon, model
 Rod Stewart, singer
 Jessie Wallace, actress
 Bradley Walsh, actor and television presenter
 Adrian Whitbread, football coach
 Gary Wraight, footballer

See also
 List of twin towns and sister cities in the United Kingdom

References

Further reading
 
 
 
 Parish Profile: Epping – information about Epping from the 2001 census (PDF file)

External links

 Epping Forest District Council

 
Market towns in Essex
Towns in Essex
Civil parishes in Essex
Epping Forest District